Instancing may refer to:

 Geometry instancing, a technique used in realtime rendering
 Dungeon instancing, a technique used in online games to provide individual players or groups of players with their own instance of some sort of content at the same time

See also
 Instantiation (disambiguation)